REGISTRAR-LOCK is a status code that can be set on an Internet domain name by the sponsoring registrar of the domain name. This is usually done in order to prevent unauthorized, unwanted or accidental changes to the domain name.

When set, the following actions are prohibited by the domain name registry:
 Modification of the domain name, including:
 Transferring of the domain name
 Deletion of the domain name
 Modification of the domain contact details

Renewal of the domain name is, however, still possible when REGISTRAR-LOCK is set.

Not all Top-level domains (TLDs) support REGISTRAR-LOCK, e.g. .org.uk, and others.

The .ca TLD added support for REGISTRAR-LOCK in October 2010.

See also
 Domain privacy
 Domain slamming
 Transfer secret

References

Domain Name System